Scopula iterata is a moth of the  family Geometridae. It is found in Rwanda.

References

Moths described in 1978
iterata
Moths of Africa